Monolopia lanceolata, the hillside daisy or common monolopia, is a species of flowering plant in the family Asteraceae. It is endemic to the southern half of California, where it grows in many types of habitat, including coastal and valley grassland, chaparral, woodland, and desert.

Description
Monolopia lanceolata  is an annual herb producing a slender, sometimes branching stem up to about 80 centimeters tall. It is usually somewhat woolly in texture.

The inflorescences at the ends of stem branches bear small hemispheric flower heads. The golden ray florets are 1 to 2 centimeters long and have three-lobed tips. They surround a center of many disc florets.

The fruit is a rough-haired achene 2 to 4 millimeters long.

References

External links
Jepson Manual Treatment for Monolopia lanceolata
USDA Plants Profile of Monolopia lanceolata (common monolopia)
Flora of North America
Monolopia lanceolata — U.C. Photo gallery

Madieae
Endemic flora of California
Flora of the California desert regions
Flora of the Sierra Nevada (United States)
Natural history of the California chaparral and woodlands
Natural history of the California Coast Ranges
Natural history of the Central Valley (California)
Natural history of the Mojave Desert
Natural history of the Peninsular Ranges
Natural history of the Santa Monica Mountains
Natural history of the Transverse Ranges
Flora without expected TNC conservation status